A  (Icelandic for 'sign post, wayfinder') is an Icelandic magical stave intended to help the bearer find their way through rough weather. The symbol is attested in the Huld Manuscript, collected in Iceland by Geir Vigfusson in Akureyri in 1860, and does not have any earlier attestations.

It has been claimed that it also features in the Galdrabók, a magical grimoire. although this latter location is denied and contested by Jackson Crawford. Stephen E. Flowers lists the Vegvisir in his translation of the Galdrabók, but in a later publication cites it in “Isländische Zauberzeichen und Zauberbücher” by Ólafur Davíðsson rather than the Galdrabók. It is also only claimed to be in the Huld manuscript by Daniel McCoy. Tomáš Vlasatý claims that it is not only in the Huld manuscript but also in two other Icelandic grimoires, Galdrakver (designated Lbs 2917 a 4to and Lbs 4627 8vo) and has Christian roots.

The  is often confused to be a Viking symbol. There is however no evidence of this, and the Huld Manuscript, where it is mentioned, was collected eight centuries after the end of the Viking Age.

Etymology 

 ('way') +  ('pointer') derives its meaning from the same word as the English wise. It points someone the right way.

See also
Helm of Awe

Notes

Bibliography
Flowers, Stephen (1989). The Galdrabók: An Icelandic Grimoire. Samuel Weiser, Inc. 
Justin Foster Huld Manuscript of Galdrastafir Witchcraft Magic Symbols and Runes - English Translation (2015)
Geirsson, Olgair (2004). Galdrakver: A Book of Magic. Landsbokasafn Islands Haskolabokasafn 
Skuggi J Eggertsson Galdraskraeda The Sorcerer's Screed

External links
Scans of the Huld Manuscript, including the Vegvísir, at Handrit.is

Icelandic folklore
Icelandic culture
Witchcraft in Iceland
Magic symbols